The 1971–72 Albanian National Championship was the 33rd season of the Albanian National Championship, the top professional league for association football clubs, since its establishment in 1930.

Overview
It was contested by 14 teams, and Vllaznia won the championship.

League table

Note: '17 Nëntori' is Tirana, 'Lokomotiva Durrës' is Teuta, 'Traktori' is Lushnja

Results

References
Albania - List of final tables (RSSSF)

Kategoria Superiore seasons
1
Albania